The Laugfs Solar Power Station is a 20-megawatt photovoltaic power station built  north of Hambantota, in the Hambantota District of Sri Lanka. It is the single largest solar power station in the country.

Development 
The pre-development of the solar farm was initially conducted as two separate 10-megawatt power stations. The original developers,  and  conducted the feasibility studies and acquiring of the necessary licensing with the intention of subsequently selling the rights. As with most private power producers in the country, the owners of Anorchi and Irish Eco Power decided to operate under two separate companies in order to intentionally avoid development limitations such as the 10MW nameplate cap enforced in Sri Lanka.

See also 
 List of power stations in Sri Lanka

References

External links 
 
 
 

Solar power stations in Sri Lanka
Buildings and structures in Hambantota District